The 1936 William & Mary Indians football team represented The College of William & Mary during the 1936 college football season.

Schedule

References

William and Mary
William & Mary Tribe football seasons
William